= Parewa Kheda =

- village
- Location within Madhya Pradesh Location within India
- Coordinates: 23.3415828°N 77.3812494°E
- Country: India
- State: Madhya Pradesh
- District: Bhopal
- Tehsil: Huzur
- Elevation: 489 m (1,604 ft)

Population (2011)
  - Total: 815
- Time zone: UTC+5:30 (IST)
- ISO 3166 code: MP-IN
- 2011 census code: 482371

Parewa Kheda is a village in the Bhopal district of Madhya Pradesh, India. It is located in the Huzur tehsil and the Phanda block.

== Demographics ==
According to the 2011 census of India, Parewa Kheda had 154 households. The effective literacy rate (i.e. the literacy rate of population excluding children aged 6 and below) was 69.22%.

Demographics (2011 Census)
	Total	Male	Female
Population	815	427	388
Children aged below 6 years	162	79	83
Scheduled caste	180	94	86
Scheduled tribe	0	0	0
Literates	452	272	180
Workers (all)	278	212	66
Main workers (total)	114	99	15
Main workers: Cultivators	53	48	5
Main workers: Agricultural labourers	16	13	3
Main workers: Household industry workers	0	0	0
Main workers: Other	45	38	7
Marginal workers (total)	164	113	51
Marginal workers: Cultivators	33	22	11
Marginal workers: Agricultural labourers	91	58	33
Marginal workers: Household industry workers	1	1	0
Marginal workers: Others	39	32	7
Non-workers	537	215	322
